Volleyball at the Pacific Games (previously known as the South Pacific Games) has been played since 1963.

Pacific Games

Men's tournament

Women's tournament

Pacific Mini Games
Indoor volleyball was introduced to the South Pacific Mini Games in 1997 at Pago Pago, American Samoa.

Men

Women

See also
Beach volleyball at the Pacific Games
Asian Men's Volleyball Championship
Asian Women's Volleyball Championship

Notes

References

 
Pacific Games
Volleyball competitions in Oceania
Pacific Games